Xenoprosopa is a genus of bee flies in the family Bombyliidae, the sole genus of the subfamily Xenoprosopinae. The only described species in the genus is X. paradoxa Hesse, 1956.

References

External links
 iNaturalist World Checklist

Bombyliidae